Tom Van Horn Moorehead (April 12, 1898 – October 21, 1979) was an American politician who served as a Republican member of the U.S. House of Representatives from Ohio from 1961 to 1963.

Biography 
Moorehead was born in Zanesville, Ohio.  He attended the public schools, Ohio Wesleyan University at Delaware, Ohio, and George Washington University at Washington, D.C.  During the First World War, he served in United States Naval Aviation Corps.  He was engaged in the real estate and insurance business in Zanesville, and served as a member of city council and mayor of Zanesville.  He was a member of the Ohio Senate serving eight terms.

Congress 
Moorehead was elected as a Republican to the Eighty-seventh Congress.  He was an unsuccessful candidate for reelection in 1962 to the Eighty-eighth Congress.

Death 
He resided in Zanesville, where he died October 21, 1979.  Interment in Greenwood Cemetery.

Sources

The Political Graveyard

1898 births
1979 deaths
Republican Party Ohio state senators
Politicians from Zanesville, Ohio
United States Navy personnel of World War I
Mayors of places in Ohio
Ohio Wesleyan University alumni
George Washington University alumni
20th-century American politicians
Republican Party members of the United States House of Representatives from Ohio